Dmytro Zajciw (Ukr. Дмитро Зайців; 17 February 1897 – December 1976) was a Ukrainian and Brazilian entomologist, notable for his collection and for his many beetle discoveries. He was born in Velyka Mykhailivka, Ukraine and died in Rio de Janeiro, Brazil. He was the author of Two new genera and species of neotropical Longhorn beetles (Coleoptera Cerambycidae), 1957, Contribution to the study of Longhorn beetles of Rio de Janeiro (Coleoptera Cerambycidae), 1958, and was the first to describe the genera Adesmoides and Pseudogrammopsis, as well as the species Beraba angusticollis and Mionochroma subaurosum, among many others.

References 

1897 births
1976 deaths
Brazilian entomologists
Ukrainian emigrants to Brazil
20th-century Ukrainian zoologists
20th-century Brazilian zoologists